Alvin Jemmott (born 21 June 1906, date of death unknown) was a Guyanese cricketer. He played in one first-class match for British Guiana in 1925/26.

See also
 List of Guyanese representative cricketers

References

External links
 

1906 births
Year of death missing
Guyanese cricketers
Guyana cricketers